Alain Delbe (born October 24, 1954 in Douai) is a French writer, child psychologist and psychotherapist.

In 1994, he won the Prix Alain-Fournier for his novel Les Îles jumelles. He is also the author of novels François l'Ardent in 1999, Golems and Le complexe de Médée in 2004, Sigiriya, le Rocher du Lion in 2012, one of a trilogy of novels. He has also published criticism in the revues Otrante and Hauteurs. In 1995, he published with L'Harmattan, Le stade vocal, an essay of psychoanalysis, followed by a second in 2014, La voix contre le langage.

Honours 
 1994 : Prix Alain-Fournier for Les Îles jumelles

Notes and references 

1954 births
People from Douai
20th-century French non-fiction writers
21st-century French non-fiction writers
Prix Alain-Fournier winners
French psychotherapists
French psychologists
Living people